Jacobus Johannes Martinus Paulus "Jean-Paul" van Gastel (born 28 April 1972 in Breda, North Brabant) is a retired football midfielder from the Netherlands, who obtained five caps for the Dutch national team, scoring twice. Currently, he is the Head Coach of Guangzhou City in the Chinese Super League.

Club career
Van Gastel started his professional career in 1990 with Willem II, where he stayed for six seasons, before moving to Feyenoord. There he won the Dutch title (1999). He moved to Italy in 2001 and played for Ternana Calcio (Serie B) and Como Calcio 1907 (Serie A). He ended his career in 2003 with De Graafschap.

Coaching career
In the end as a player, he worked from 2004 to 2005 as Head Coach of the U-19 team of Willem II. On 30 June 2005, he began his coaching career with the U-19 of Feyenoord.

During his stint at Feyenoord as an assistant coach, he alongside Giovanni van Bronckhorst won 5 trophies at the De Kuip, including an Eredivisie and KNVB Cup.

Then in 2020, he joined alongside Giovanni van Bronckhorst in joining Guangzhou R&F as an assistant coach. After that season, he became head coach of the club after van Bronckhorst's resignation.

In the 2021 season of the Chinese Super League, he led Guangzhou City to a ninth-place finish in the regular standings and a seventh-place finish in the championship round. Including notable matches versus Qingdao 4–2, Beijing Guoan 5–0, and their city rivals, Guangzhou FC by 2-2 and 3-3 respectively.

On May 11, 2022, his Twitter account announced that he penned a one-year extension for Guangzhou City.

Honours

Player
 Feyenoord
 Eredivisie: 1998–99
 Johan Cruyff Shield: 1999

Manager 
Feyenoord
Eredivisie: 2016–17
KNVB Cup: 2015–16, 2017–18
Johan Cruyff Shield: 2017, 2018

References

  Profile

1972 births
Living people
Dutch footballers
Dutch expatriate footballers
Netherlands international footballers
Association football midfielders
Eredivisie players
Serie B players
Expatriate footballers in Italy
Dutch expatriate sportspeople in Italy
Willem II (football club) players
Feyenoord players
Ternana Calcio players
Como 1907 players
De Graafschap players
Footballers from Breda
Guangzhou City F.C. managers
Guangzhou City F.C. non-playing staff
Feyenoord non-playing staff
Association football coaches